The Stoning of Saint Stephen is a 1522 painting by the German Renaissance artist Hans Baldung. It is on display in the Musée de l'Œuvre Notre-Dame. Its inventory number is MBA 315 ("MBA" stands for Musée des Beaux-Arts).

The painting had been badly damaged by the fire that broke out on 13 August 1947 in the Palais Rohan, reducing some works to ashes and disfiguring others through the intense heat and smoke. It was finally restored starting in 2021, and presented again to the public 75 years after its near-destruction. The painting is notable for its origin, having been commissioned by the cardinal Albert of Brandenburg, and for the presence of a self-portrait of the artist, sporting a moustache

References

External links 

1522 paintings
Paintings in the Musée de l'Œuvre Notre-Dame
Paintings by Hans Baldung
Paintings in the collection of the Musée des Beaux-Arts de Strasbourg
Oil on canvas paintings
Paintings of Saint Stephen